Sharivka is an urban-type settlement in Bohodukhiv Raion of Kharkiv Oblast in Ukraine. It is located on the left bank of the Merchyk, a tributary of the Merla in the drainage basin of the Dnieper. Sharivka belongs to Bohodukhiv urban hromada, one of the hromadas of Ukraine. Population:  At least 332 of Sharivka’s Jews were murdered during the Holocaust.

Economy

Transportation
The settlement has access by local roads to Kharkiv and Krasnokutsk.

References

Urban-type settlements in Bohodukhiv Raion